Mattson Lake is a lake in Douglas County, in the U.S. state of Minnesota.

Mattson Lake was named for John Mattson, a pioneer who settled in the area in 1868.

See also
List of lakes in Minnesota

References

Lakes of Minnesota
Lakes of Douglas County, Minnesota